The 1977 College Football All-America team is composed of college football players who were selected as All-Americans by various organizations and writers that chose College Football All-America Teams in 1977. The National Collegiate Athletic Association (NCAA) recognizes four selectors as "official" for the 1977 season. They are: (1) the American Football Coaches Association (AFCA); (2) the Associated Press (AP) selected based on the votes of sports writers at AP newspapers; (3) the Football Writers Association of America (FWAA) selected by the nation's football writers; and (4) the United Press International (UPI) selected based on the votes of sports writers at UPI newspapers.  Other selectors included Football News (FN), the Newspaper Enterprise Association (NEA), The Sporting News (TSN), and the Walter Camp Football Foundation (WC).

Eight players were unanimously selected by all four official selectors and all four unofficial selectors. They were Ken MacAfee of Notre Dame, offensive tackle Chris Ward of Ohio State, offensive guard Mark Donahue of Michigan, running backs Earl Campbell of Texas and Terry Miller of Oklahoma State, defensive ends Art Still of Kentucky and Ross Browner of Notre Dame, defensive tackle Brad Shearer of Texas.

Consensus All-Americans
The following charts identify the NCAA-recognized consensus All-Americans for the year 1977 and displays which first-team designations they received.

Offense

Defense

Offense

Receivers 

 Ozzie Newsome, Alabama (AFCA [split end], AP-1, FWAA, UPI-2, FN [end], NEA-1, TSN, WC)
 John Jefferson, Arizona State (AFCA [flanker], AP-1, FWAA, NEA-2)
 Wes Chandler, Florida (AP-2, UPI-1, FN [running back], NEA-1, TSN)
 James Lofton, Stanford (AP-2, NEA-2)
 Gordon Jones, Pittsburgh (AP-3)
 Mike Renfro, TCU (AP-3)

Tight ends 

 Ken MacAfee, Notre Dame (AFCA, AP-1, FWAA, UPI-1, FN [end], NEA-1, TSN, WC)
 Mickey Shuler, Penn State (AP-2, NEA-2)
 Clennie Brundidge, Army (UPI-2)
 Mike Moore, Grambling (AP-3)

Tackles 

 Chris Ward, Ohio State (AFCA, AP-1, FWAA, UPI-1, FN, NEA-1, TSN, WC)
 Dan Irons, Texas Tech (AFCA, UPI-1, FN, WC)
 Keith Dorney Penn State (AP-3, FWAA)
 Gordon King, Stanford (UPI-2, NEA-1, TSN)
 Dennis Baker, Wyoming (AP-1)
 William Fifer, West Texas State (AP-2)
 Mike Kenn, Michigan (AP-2)
 James Taylor, Missouri (AP-3, UPI-2)
 Frank Meyers, Texas A&M (NEA-2)
 Jeff Morrow, Minnesota (NEA-2)

Guards 

 Mark Donahue, Michigan (AFCA, AP-1, FWAA, UPI-1, FN, NEA-1, TSN, WC)
 Leotis Harris, Arkansas (AFCA, AP-1, UPI-1, NEA-1, WC)
 Joe Bostic, Clemson (AP-3, FWAA, NEA-2)
 Greg Roberts, Oklahoma (AP-3, FN)
 George Collins, Georgia (TSN)
 Jim Hough, Utah State (AP-2)
 Ernie Hughes, Notre Dame (AP-2, UPI-2)
 Leon White, Colorado (UPI-2)
 Bob Cryder, Alabama (NEA-2)

Centers 

 Tom Brzoza, Pittsburgh (AP-1, UPI-1, WC)
 Walt Downing, Michigan (AFCA, AP-3, FN, NEA-2, TSN)
 Tom Davis, Nebraska (FWAA, UPI-2)
 Blair Bush, Washington (AP-2, NEA-1)

Quarterbacks 

 Guy Benjamin, Stanford (AP-2, FWAA, UPI-1, FN, NEA-1)
 Doug Williams, Grambling State (AP-1, UPI-2, NEA-2, TSN, WC)
 Matt Cavanaugh, Pittsburgh (AFCA)
 Derrick Ramsey, Kentucky (AP-3)

Running backs 

 Earl Campbell, Texas (AFCA, AP-1, FWAA, UPI-1, FN, NEA-1, TSN, WC)
 Terry Miller, Oklahoma State (AFCA, AP-1, FWAA, UPI-1, FN, NEA-1, TSN, WC)
 Charles Alexander, LSU (AFCA, AP-2, FWAA, UPI-1, NEA-2, WC)
 John Pagliaro, Yale (AP-3, WC)
 Jerome Persell, Western Michigan (AP-2)
 I. M. Hipp, Nebraska (UPI-2, NEA-2)
 Johnny Davis, Alabama (UPI-2)
 Ben Cowins, Arkansas (UPI-2)
 Bo Robinson, West Texas State (AP-3)

Defense

Defensive ends 

 Art Still, Kentucky  (AFCA, AP-1, FWAA, UPI-1, FN, NEA-1, TSN, WC)
 Ross Browner, Notre Dame (AFCA, AP-1, FWAA, UPI-1, FN, NEA-1, TSN, WC)
 John Anderson, Michigan (UPI-2)
 Kelton Dansler, Ohio State (AP-2)
 Willie Fry, Notre Dame (UPI-2)
 Hugh Green, Pittsburgh (AP-2)
 Al Harris, Arizona State (NEA-2)
 Jerry DeLoach, California (AP-3)
 Chuck Schott, Army (AP-3)

Defensive tackles 
 Brad Shearer, Texas (AFCA, AP-1, FWAA, UPI-1, FN, NEA-1, TSN, WC)
 Randy Holloway, Pittsburgh (AFCA, AP-2, FWAA, UPI-1, FN, NEA-1, TSN, WC)
 Dee Hardison, North Carolina (AP-1, FWAA, FN, NEA-2)
 Mike Bell, Colorado State (AP-2)
 Aaron Brown, Ohio State (UPI-2)
 Manu Tuiasosopo, UCLA (UPI-2)
 Mikeli Ieremia, Brigham Young (NEA-2)
 Larry Bethea, Michigan State (AP-3, NEA-2 [DE])
 Jimmy Walker, Arkansas (AP-3)

Middle guards 
 Aaron Brown, Ohio St. (AFCA, WC)
 Reggie Kinlaw, Oklahoma (AP-3, UPI-1)
 Randy Sidler, Penn State (AP-1)
 Dee Hardison, North Carolina (UPI-2)
 Don Latimer, Pittsburgh (AP-2)

Linebackers 

 Jerry Robinson, UCLA (AFCA, AP-1, FWAA, UPI-1, FN, NEA-1, WC)
 Tom Cousineau, Ohio State  (AP-2, FWAA, UPI-1, NEA-2, WC)
 Gary Spani, Kansas St. (AFCA, AP-3, UPI-1, FN, NEA-2)
 Mike Woods, Cincinnati (AP-1, NEA-1, TSN)
 Lucius Sanford, Georgia Tech (AFCA, AP-2, UPI-2, TSN)
 Clay Matthews, Jr., USC (NEA-1, TSN)
 Daryl Hunt, Oklahoma (AP-3, UPI-2, FN, WC)
 John Anderson, Michigan (FWAA)
 George Cumby, Oklahoma (AP-1)
 Bob Golic, Notre Dame (AP-2, UPI-2)
 Harold Randolph, East Carolina (NEA-2)
 Michael Jackson, Washington (AP-3)

Defensive backs 

 Zac Henderson, Oklahoma (AFCA, AP-1, FWAA, UPI-1, FN, NEA-1, WC)
 Dennis Thurman, USC (AFCA, AP-1, FWAA, UPI-1, FN, NEA-2, WC)
 Luther Bradley, Notre Dame  (AFCA, AP-2, UPI-1, FN, NEA-2, TSN, WC)
 Bob Jury, Pittsburgh (AP-1, FWAA, UPI-2, NEA-2, TSN, WC)
 Keith Simpson, Memphis State (NEA-1, TSN)
 Ray Griffin, Ohio State (UPI-2, NEA-1, TSN)
 Ken Greene, Washington State (NEA-1)
 Dwight Hicks, Michigan (AP-2)
 Bill Krug, Georgia (UPI-2)
 Charles Williams, Jackson State (AP-2)
 Eric Felton, Texas Tech (NEA-2)
 Larry Anderson, Louisiana Tech (AP-3)
 Ron Johnson, Eastern Michigan (AP-3)
 John Sturges, Navy (AP-3)

Special teams

Kickers 

 Steve Little, Arkansas (FWAA, UPI-1, NEA-1, TSN)
 Tony Franklin, Texas A&M (NEA-2)

Punters 

 Russell Erxleben, Texas (FWAA, UPI-2, NEA-1, TSN)
 John Evans, NC State (NEA-2)

Key

Official selectors

Other selectors

See also
 1977 All-Big Eight Conference football team
 1977 All-Big Ten Conference football team
 1977 All-Pacific-8 Conference football team
 1977 All-SEC football team

References 

All-America Team
College Football All-America Teams